Atlantic Coast Line Railroad Commercial and Industrial Historic District is a national historic district located at Petersburg, Virginia. The district includes 15 contributing buildings, 1 contributing structure, and 1 contributing object located in a predominantly industrial and commercial section of Petersburg. The section housed some of Petersburg's important industries – tobacco and wholesale grocery and confectioner.  Notable buildings include the Cameron Building (c. 1879), Export Leaf Tobacco Company (1913), H.P. Harrison Company (1912), Brown & Williamson complex, and Gibson Drive-in.

It was listed on the National Register of Historic Places in 2009.

References

Industrial buildings and structures on the National Register of Historic Places in Virginia
Historic districts on the National Register of Historic Places in Virginia
Art Deco architecture in Virginia
Buildings and structures in Petersburg, Virginia
National Register of Historic Places in Petersburg, Virginia
Atlantic Coast Line Railroad